Privacy-Enhanced Mail (PEM) is a de facto file format for storing and sending cryptographic keys, certificates, and other data, based on a set of 1993 IETF standards defining "privacy-enhanced mail." While the original standards were never broadly adopted and were supplanted by PGP and S/MIME, the textual encoding they defined became very popular. The PEM format was eventually formalized by the IETF in RFC 7468.

Format
Many cryptography standards use ASN.1 to define their data structures, and Distinguished Encoding Rules (DER) to serialize those structures. Because DER produces binary output, it can be challenging to transmit the resulting files through systems, like electronic mail, that only support ASCII.

The PEM format solves this problem by encoding the binary data using base64. The label determines the type of message encoded.

-----BEGIN PRIVATE KEY-----

-----END PRIVATE KEY-----

PEM data is commonly stored in files with a ".pem" suffix, a ".cer" or ".crt" suffix (for certificates), or a ".key" suffix (for public or private keys). The label inside a PEM file represents the type of the data more accurately than the file suffix, since many different types of data can be saved in a ".pem" file.  In particular PEM refers to the header and base64 wrapper for a binary format contained within, but does not specify any type or format for the binary data, so that a PEM file may contain "almost anything base64 encoded and wrapped with BEGIN and END lines".

A PEM file may contain multiple instances. For instance, an operating system might provide a file containing a list of trusted CA certificates, or a web server might be configured with a "chain" file containing an end-entity certificate plus a list of intermediate certificates.

Privacy-enhanced mail 
The PEM format was first developed in the privacy-enhanced mail series of RFCs: RFC 1421, RFC 1422, RFC 1423, and RFC 1424. These standards assumed prior deployment of a hierarchical public key infrastructure (PKI) with a single root. Such a PKI was never deployed, due to operational cost and legal liability concerns. These standards were eventually obsoleted by PGP and S/MIME, competing e-mail encryption standards.

History 
The initiative to develop Privacy Enhanced Mail began in 1985 on behalf of the PSRG (Privacy and Security Research Group) also known as the Internet Research Task Force.

References 

Cryptographic protocols
Computer file formats